View Lake is a  lake located on Vancouver Island east of the west end of Great Central Lake.

See also
List of lakes of British Columbia

References

Alberni Valley
Lakes of Vancouver Island
Clayoquot Land District